On a Cold Road: Tales of Adventure in Canadian Rock is the first book by Rheostatics guitarist David Bidini. The book is a non-fiction account of what it's like for a Canadian rock band to be on tour. The 1998 book is published by McClelland & Stewart.

In his review Mark Jarman (of The Vancouver Sun) says that the book only scratches the surface of Canadian rock history.

Canada Reads 2012
On a Cold Road was a finalist for Canada Reads 2012. The year's theme was non-fiction Canadian books as hosted by Jian Ghomeshi.  This shortlist was announced 1 November 2011. On 23 November 2011, the celebrity panelists was announced.  The book was being defended by Stacey McKenzie. The winner was Something Fierce: Memoirs of a Revolutionary Daughter by Carmen Aguirre.

Citations

External links

1998 non-fiction books
Canadian non-fiction books
Canadian biographies
Books about Canada
McClelland & Stewart books
Music autobiographies